Karel Aldair Espino Contreras (born 27 October 2001) is a Cuban professional footballer who plays as a midfielder for Liga Nacional club Comunicaciones and the Cuba national team.

International career
He made his Cuba national football team debut on 27 February 2019 in a friendly against Bermuda, as a 79th-minute substitute for Yasmany López.

He was selected for the country's 2019 CONCACAF Gold Cup squad.

Honours
Comunicaciones 
CONCACAF League: 2021
Liga Nacional de Guatemala: Clausura 2022

References

External links
 
 

2001 births
Living people
Cuban footballers
Cuba international footballers
Cuba youth international footballers
Association football midfielders
FC Artemisa players
2019 CONCACAF Gold Cup players
People from San Cristóbal, Cuba